Flannel weed is a common name for several plants and may refer to:

Sida cordifolia
Solanum mauritianum
Verbascum thapsus